Donggong is a town under the administration of Nanzhang County, Hubei, China. , it has two residential communities and 22 villages under its administration.

References 

Township-level divisions of Hubei
Nanzhang County